Hiss Spun is the fifth studio album by American singer-songwriter Chelsea Wolfe, released on September 22, 2017, by Sargent House. The album was recorded in Salem, Massachusetts, at Converge guitarist Kurt Ballou's God City Studio. Produced by Wolfe and Ben Chisholm, the album also features guitar contributions from Troy Van Leeuwen of Queens of the Stone Age and a guest appearance from Aaron Turner of Isis.

Hiss Spun received positive reviews from music critics, and peaked at No. 146 on the Billboard 200, becoming her second consecutive album to enter the chart.

Themes
In an interview for Noisey, Wolfe explained that the album's topics deal with her confronting various health issues: "I deal with extreme anxiety that gets exacerbated by bouts of insomnia [...] I’m constantly trying to find ways to calm down… That has manifested into addiction at times [and] I carried a lot of that into this record, especially on '16 Psyche' and 'Spun'."

Wolfe also disclosed that the album had been about coming to terms with issues both familial and personal. In the interview, she stated that "there were some things I hadn't dealt with before, from the dark past of my family, to relationships I'd had, to my own health, some of the songs became a personal exorcism and some of them were written in dedication to the hardships that others have faced."

Release
Wolfe announced Hiss Spun on June 14, 2017, coinciding with the release of "16 Psyche" as the first single from the album. NPR simultaneously released an article reviewing the song and previewing the album, whereupon writer Paula Mejia wrote, "The impetus for Hiss Spun stemmed from a reckoning with family history, personal life and other elements that have long shadowed Wolfe, and the resulting escapist music also functions as a kind of exorcism, an expunging of the soul. But what "16 Psyche" especially goes to show is that despite what's going on in our own worlds and the one at large, the discovery of new ones — whether they're made of fire or ice or even metal — is a worthy pursuit, and certainly one worth fighting for."

On July 5, Wolfe released a trailer for the album and announced dates for a North American tour with Youth Code in support of the album.

"Vex" was the second track to be released from the album. Wolfe unveiled the song on July 27, revealing the contributions by Van Leeuwen and Turner. In a letter published by The Fader on August 2, Wolfe described the process she went through to create the song: "'Vex' began almost as a black metal song, with a pummeling blast beat, then Ben (Chisholm) and I stripped it back to a more industrial electronic sound. Once we were in the studio, Jess Gowrie's drums and Troy Van Leeuwen's guitar parts began to shepherd it back toward its heavy origins... I knew from the beginning that I wanted Aaron Turner's voice somewhere on this album, and could hear him in my head on 'Vex'. I had already recorded my vocals for the song but decided to send it to Aaron without them on. Happily, the first time we played it back with both vocal parts they fit together in a very compelling way."

A promotional video was released for "16 Psyche" on August 14, accompanied by the Noisey interview. Wolfe revealed two more of the album's tracks shortly before its release, with both "The Culling" and "Offering" being made available online on September 7.

Critical reception

Hiss Spun received universal acclaim from music critics. At Metacritic, which assigns a normalized rating out of 100 to reviews from mainstream critics, the album received an average score of 81, based on 19 reviews. Journalist Sam Shepherd praised the album in his review for MusicOMH, noting: "While Wolfe's incredible vocals are the main draw, her long term collaborator Ben Chisholm deserves significant recognition too. Not only does his fuzzed-to-fuck bass make these songs feel genuinely threatening, his manipulation of sound and creation of washes and collages provides unsettling backgrounds for Wolfe to weave her magic over. Without him, the oppressive atmospherics of the album wouldn't be nearly as effective." Similarly, The Skinnys Adam Turner-Heffer wrote, "Ballou's signature crushing heaviness may have become a cliché in some circles, but paired with Wolfe's beautiful voice and brilliant writing, it's a match made in heaven." AllMusic critic Heather Phares wrote, "Both fierce and fragile, Hiss Spun presents an artist in compelling control of the entire scope of her expression." Emma Madden of Drowned in Sound said, "Though Hiss Spun probably won't end up as the best of her career, it may well be Wolfe's best so far."

Pitchforks Saby Reyes-Kulkarni stated that with Hiss Spun, Wolfe "dives headfirst into sludge metal and creates a unique space where sweetness can be heavy and contact is always uncomfortable". Luke Cartledge of The Line of Best Fit rated the album 8.5 out of 10, remarking, "Wolfe has never shied away from the heavy, the metallic, but this is her first record to fully embrace the extremities offered by doom and experimental metal". Josh Goller of Slant Magazine noted that "though it may be her second consecutive album to lean heavily on metal, Hiss Spun deftly incorporates a diverse range of sounds." Exclaim!s Matt Yuyitung stated that "listening to Hiss Spun is a punishing affair, but it's a rewarding one too. It's the sound of an artist not afraid to dig deep emotionally, and that challenges the listener to do so as well."

In a more mixed review, Alex McLevy from The A.V. Club stated that "Hiss Spun is a full-on sludge-metal extravaganza, never content to go slow and heavy when it could be going slower and heavier. The bombast is overwhelming, and while there's an admirable zeal to her drive for making almost every second as intense as possible, it begins to get numbing."

Accolades

Track listing

Personnel
Credits adapted from the liner notes of Hiss Spun.

 Chelsea Wolfe – vocals, production, guitar 
 Ben Chisholm – production, guitar , bass , electronics , keyboards , piano 
 Aaron Turner – vocals 
 Kurt Ballou – guitar , recording
 Troy Van Leeuwen – guitar 
 Bryan Tulao – guitar 
 Christopher Orr – guitar 
 Jess Gowrie – drums 
 Ezra Buchla – viola 
 Travis Brooks – sounds 
 Alan Douches – mastering
 John Crawford – art direction, design
 Corey Holms – typography
 Bill Crisafi – photography, hair typography
 Muted Fawn – collage
 Cathy Pellow – management

Charts

References

2017 albums
Chelsea Wolfe albums
Music & Arts albums